Grandora is a hamlet in Saskatchewan.

It is located approximately 24 km (15 miles) West of Saskatoon, just south of Hwy 14.  Very little remains of the original settlement.  Mail is delivered to the Post Office which is located in the Sandyridge store, directly on Hwy 14.

The story of how Grandora received its name is a sweet one. Apparently a newly married couple, looking to settle, ventured west to find a homestead.  At one point the husband found a spot he liked and remarked "Isn't it just grand, Dora?!", and so the spot was named Grandora.

References

Unincorporated communities in Saskatchewan
Vanscoy No. 345, Saskatchewan